The Russian Circuit Racing Series (RCRS) is a national Russian racing series created in 2004. It incorporates four classes: touring, super-production, touring-light, national class and national-junior (since 2015). Sergey Krylov has been the championship's promoter since 2004, in 2014 Oleg Petrikov became promoter of the series.

Circuits

Classes in detail

Touring 

The international category where cars with two-litre engines and some physical alterations compete. Typical representatives include: BMW 320, Audi A4, Subaru BRZ, Honda Civic and Accord, Chevrolet Lacetti and Cruze, SEAT León.

TCR Russian Series 
In 2015 it was announced that cars under the new TCR regulations (as used in the TCR International Series) will be eligible to compete alongside the Touring class, but also have their standalone classification. Typical representatives include: SEAT León Cup Racer, Audi RS3 LMS TCR, LADA Vesta TCR and Renault Megane RS

Touring-Light 

Cars with 1600cc engines compete in this class. Typical representatives include: Ford Fiesta, VW Polo, Lada Kalina, Kia Rio, Renault Twingo Sport, Peugeot 208 GTI.

Super-Production 
This is an international category where cars with the two litre engine compete. Typical representatives: Honda Civic, Subaru BRZ, Lada Granta.

National class 
1600сс engine category for cars assembled in the territory of the Russian Federation. Typical representatives: Lada Kalina, Lada 112, Lada Riva, Renault Logan/Sandero, VW Polo, Kia Rio.

National-Junior class 
Category for drivers from 12 to 16 years old. Typical representatives: Lada Kalina, Lada Samara, VW Polo.

Champions

References 

 

 
Touring car racing series
Auto racing series in Russia